Sitaram Janardan Kunte is a 1985-batch Indian Administrative Service officer. He is a former chief secretary to Government of Maharashtra. Now, he is appointed as principal advisor to in CMO Maharashtra. 
Sitaram Janardan Kunte succeeded Subodh Kumar as the Municipal Commissioner of Mumbai on May 1, 2012.

Career
Sitaram Kunte has handed several departments in the Maharashtra Government . He was head of Maharashtra Housing and Area Development Authority and served as an additional municipal commissioner in the BMC.

Government of Maharashtra Departments
additional chief secretary (personnel) general administration department, government of Maharashtra June 2018 – present
Principal Secretary Government of Maharashtra in the Finance Department May 2015 – April 2016
Municipal Commissioner Municipal Corporation of Greater Mumbai April 2012 – May 2015 
Principal Secretary, Planning Department Government of Maharashtra June 2011 – May 2012
Principal Secretary Planning Department and Development Commissioner in Government of Maharashtra.
Secretary, Housing Department Government of Maharashtra May 2008 – September 2010

References

1961 births
Living people
Government of Maharashtra
Indian Administrative Service officers